Pietromonaco is a surname. Notable people with the name include:

Don Pietromonaco (1935–1997), American actor and radio personality
Paula R. Pietromonaco, American psychologist